FIBA Europe is the administrative body for basketball in Europe, within the International Basketball Federation (FIBA), which includes all 50 national European basketball federations. In reaction to the 2022 Russian invasion of Ukraine, FIBA Europe mandated that no official basketball competitions are to be held in either Russia or Belarus, while the teams of the Russian Basketball Federation and of the Belarusian Basketball Federation are being withdrawn from national team competitions and from the club competition season 2022–23.

Structure 

FIBA Europe is one of five Regions of FIBA and is responsible for controlling and developing the sport of basketball in Europe. Among many tasks, this includes promoting, supervising and directing international competition at the club and national team levels, as well as governing and appointing European international referees. FIBA Europe is an international federation whose membership consists of the national basketball federations of Europe, of which there are currently 50 members.

The highest decision-making body is the Board of FIBA Europe which consists of 25 persons elected by the National Federations. The Board of FIBA Europe meets twice a year and is the executive body which represents all 50 Federations that make up the membership of FIBA Europe. All 50 federations meet once a year at the General Assembly of FIBA Europe.

The Board of FIBA Europe 
The current board members are:

  Turgay Demirel, president
  Karl Thaller, treasurer
  Athos Antoniou
  Maurizio Bertea
  Iván Bodrogváry
  Wolfgang Brenscheidt
  Matej Erjavec
  Manuel Fernandes
  Natalia Galkina
  Jorge Garbajosa
  Georgi Glouchkov
  John Goncalves
  Amiram Halevy
  George Kartvelishvili
  Michal Konecny
  Keio Kuhi
  Nastassia Marynina
  Bernard O'Byrne
  Giancarlo Sergi
  Jean-Pierre Siutat
  Edgars Šneps
  Mindaugas Spokas
  Carmen Tocala 
  Stojan Vranković
  Asterios Zois

Current Executive Committee members

Presidents

Executive Directors
Until 1 January 2015, the position was titled as a Secretary General.

Competitions

FIBA Europe competitions

National teams
 EuroBasket:
 Men's, played every four years
 Women's, played biennially
 FIBA European Championship for Small Countries
 Men's, played biennially
 Women's, played biennially
 FIBA U20 European Championship, played annually
 FIBA U18 European Championship, played annually
 FIBA U16 European Championship, played annually
 FIBA U20 Women's European Championship, played annually
 FIBA U18 Women's European Championship, played annually
 FIBA U16 Women's European Championship, played annually
 3x3 national teams
 FIBA 3x3 Europe Cup, (men and women)
 FIBA Europe Under-18 3x3 Championships, (men and women)

Clubs
 Basketball Champions League, first-tier men's continental tournament
 Europe Cup, second-tier men's continental tournament
 EuroLeague Women, first-tier women's continental tournament
 EuroCup Women, second-tier women's continental tournament
 SuperCup Women, contested between the winners of EuroLeague and EuroCup
Defunct
 EuroChallenge
 EuroCup Challenge
 Korać Cup
 Ronchetti Cup
 Saporta Cup
 SuproLeague

Title holders

Continental champions

Continental club champions

Titles by country
*

FIBA World Rankings

Overview

Members

Defunct members

Notes

See also 

 FIBA Europe Men's Player of the Year Award
 FIBA Europe Young Men's Player of the Year Award
 FIBA Europe Women's Player of the Year Award
 FIBA Europe Young Women's Player of the Year Award

References

External links 

 

Sport in Munich
1957 establishments in Europe
Sports organizations established in 1957
Organisations based in Munich